Katarina Stepanović (née Vojčić; born 15 January 1985) is a Serbian handball player for RK Radnički Kragujevac and the Serbian national team.

References

1985 births
Living people
Serbian female handball players
People from Aranđelovac
Mediterranean Games medalists in handball
Mediterranean Games gold medalists for Serbia
Competitors at the 2013 Mediterranean Games